A magnitude 6.9 earthquake struck Myanmar  north-west of Mandalay on April 13 with a maximum Mercalli intensity of VI (Strong). It struck at 8:25 pm local time (13:55 UTC), and was centered in an isolated area. The estimated depth was 134 km. It lasted for around one minute according to Xinhua reporters.

There were no reports of major damage or loss of life as a result of the tremor in Myanmar.

The tremor was also felt in Bangladesh and India. In India, at least two people died and more than 70 were reported to have been injured. 50 people were injured in Chittagong, Bangladesh, rushing out of Ready Made Garment factories. Some fifty persons suffered injuries in the Bangladeshi capital Dhaka and north eastern city of Sylhet as they fled their homes and other buildings during the earthquake. Tremors were also felt in eastern and central Nepal.

See also
 List of earthquakes in 2016
 List of earthquakes in Myanmar
 List of earthquakes in India
 List of earthquakes in Bangladesh

References

External links

2016 earthquakes
2016 in Bangladesh
2016 disasters in India
2016 in Myanmar
2016 in Nepal
2016 disasters in Pakistan
Earthquakes in Bangladesh
Earthquakes in India
Earthquakes in Myanmar
Earthquakes in Nepal
Earthquakes in Pakistan
April 2016 events in Asia
2016 disasters in Myanmar